Albidovulum inexpectatum is a thermophilic and strictly aerobic bacteria from the genus of Albidovulum which has been isolated from a marine hot spring from the Island of San Miquel.

References 

Rhodobacteraceae
Bacteria described in 2003